Kanda is a small historic, scenic town and tehsil in Bageshwar district, in the state of Uttarakhand, India.

History
Kanda was ruled by the Katyuri Kings from the 7th to the 13th century. Upon the disintegration of the Katyuris in 13th century, Kanda came under the rule of Mankoti kings of Gangoli. In the 16th century, the Chand king, Balo Kalyan Chand, invaded Mankot, the seat of Mankoti kings, and annexed Gangoli to his kingdom, the Kumaon Kingdom.

Geography
Its surrounding landscape is characterized by mountains, terraced fields, and organic tea platforms. However, this scenic landscape is under threat, as the quarrying of soft stone is reported to have caused damage to the local ecology.

Transport

National Highway 309A passes through Kanda. Most of the internal transportation is via shared taxis called "Jeeps". Jeeps are available for the nearby cities of Bageshwar and Chaukori. Roadway buses connect Kanda to Delhi, while Kumaon Motor Owners Union (KMOU) transport connects to other major cities in the state of Uttarakhand, such as Almora, Haldwani, Pithoragarh, Bankot, and Didihat.

Economy
Kanda is known for its rich scenic beauty, rural tourism, Kalishan temple, and town center typified by its cluster of markets, which are main attractions for the town's developing tourism industry.
Many youngsters from this area are serving in defence forces.
Kanda Mahotsav is a three day festival. Ramlila Dussehra is celebrated here as well.

Demographics
The tehsil has a population of 26,272 as of 2011.

Education
Kanda is known for its schools and offers options for higher education. It is the site of the old Middle School (now Government Inter College) that was established in 1902. Alumni include Professor D.D. Pant, physicist, and Prof. T.S. Papola, a noted development economist. Government Degree college was opened in 2008 and several new courses were introduced in 2016.
 Government Inter College, Kanda
 Government Industrial Training Institute (ITI), Kanda
 Government Polytechnic Kanda
 Countrywide Public School, Kanda
 GDC-Government Degree College Kanda

See also
 Uttarakhand
 Bageshwar

References

Bibliography
 
 

Cities and towns in Bageshwar district